The Suola is a river in the Sakha Republic, Russia.

The famous hill Suullar Myraan is located in the river valley.

Course
It flows roughly westwards across the lowland, with the Myla to the south among almost 1,500 lakes. The river joins the Lena  from its mouth on the eastern bank, a little north of Yakutsk, the capital of the Sakha Republic.   

The Suola freezes between October and mid May. It flows across the Amginsky District and the Megino-Kangalassky District and there are numerous settlements in its basin such as Satagay, Mukuluk, Suola, Byuteydyakh, Tyokhtyur and Tomtor. This river is an important source of drinking water for many villages.

See also
List of rivers of Russia

References

External links 

 Geography - Yakutia Organized

Rivers of the Sakha Republic